Anssi Viren (born 10 April 1977) is a Finnish football player currently playing for JJK.

References
Guardian Football

1977 births
Living people
Finnish footballers
JJK Jyväskylä players
Kotkan Työväen Palloilijat players
FC Jokerit players
Veikkausliiga players
Association football defenders
Sportspeople from Lahti